The 2013 CIS Women's Ice Hockey Championship was held March 7–10, 2013, in Toronto, Ontario, to determine a national champion for the 2012–13 CIS women's ice hockey season. The top-seeded Montréal Carabins defeated the defending champion Calgary Dinos to win the first championship in program history.

Host
The tournament was played at Varsity Arena on the campus of the University of Toronto in Toronto, Ontario. It was the second championship to be hosted by Toronto with the first occurring in 1999.

Seedings
Six CIS teams qualified for the tournament and were divided into two pools to play a round-robin tournament to determine the two teams who would play in the championship game. The winner of Pool A played the winner of Pool B in the gold medal game.

Pool A

Pool B

Game summaries

CIS Medal round

5th-place game

Bronze-medal game

Gold-medal game

Final results

References

External links
 Tournament Web Site

U Sports women's ice hockey
Ice hockey competitions in Toronto
2012–13 in Canadian ice hockey
2010s in Toronto
2013 in Ontario